Dutch is an unincorporated community in Braxton County, in the U.S. state of West Virginia.

History
A post office called Dutch was established in 1913, and remained in operation until 1943. the community was named after Bailus "Dutch" Allen, the father of an early postmaster.

References

Unincorporated communities in Braxton County, West Virginia
Unincorporated communities in West Virginia